Gustavo Balcázar Monzón (born 10 August 1927) is a Colombian lawyer and retired politician. A member of the Colombian Liberal Party, he served as Member of both the Senate and the Chamber of Representatives of Colombia, presiding over both chambers of Congress. He also served in the administrations of President Guillermo León Valencia as the 48th Governor of Valle del Cauca, and as the 16th Minister of Agriculture, and in the administration of President Julio César Turbay Ayala as the 18th Ambassador of Colombia to the United Kingdom, and Non-Resident Ambassador to Algeria.

Personal life
He was born on 10 August 1927 in Santiago de Cali, to Ricardo Balcázar and Leonor Monzón and married Bolivia Ramos, with whom he had two daughters, María Isabel and Iliana. Already divorced, he remarried to Nydia Quintero Turbay, former First Lady of Colombia, in a civil ceremony in 1984.

References

1927 births
Living people
People from Cali
Colombian Liberal Party politicians
Turbay family
Pontifical Xavierian University alumni
20th-century Colombian lawyers
Members of the Chamber of Representatives of Colombia
Presidents of the Chamber of Representatives of Colombia
Members of the Senate of Colombia
Presidents of the Senate of Colombia
Colombian Ministers of Agriculture
Ambassadors of Colombia to the United Kingdom
Presidential Designates of Colombia